Iker Hernández Ezkerro (Born 8 April 1994) is a Spanish professional footballer who plays for Santiago Wanderers in the Primera B de Chile as a striker. Besides Spain, he has played in the Netherlands and Bolivia.

Club career
Born in Urnieta, Gipuzkoa, Basque Country, Hernández graduated from Real Sociedad's youth system. On 30 June 2011 he signed his first professional deal, running until 2016.

Hernández made his debut as a senior on 26 November 2011, appearing with the reserves in a 0–3 home loss against SD Ponferradina in the Segunda División B championship. On 10 June of the following year he was definitely promoted to the B-team, and went on to appear regularly for the side in the following campaigns.

On 17 December Hernández made his first team debut, replacing Alfreð Finnbogason in a 2–0 home win against Real Oviedo, for the campaign's Copa del Rey. He made his La Liga debut four days later, again from the bench in a 1–1 away draw against Levante UD.

On 14 August 2015 Hernández was loaned to Barakaldo CF, in a season-long deal. On 1 July of the following year he signed for another reserve team, Bilbao Athletic also in the third division.

On 31 August 2018, after a one-season spell at Burgos CF, Hernández moved abroad for the first time in his career and joined Eerste Divisie side FC Den Bosch.

Hernández signed with Bolivian club Bolívar on 31 January 2018. After only one month in his new club, he was loaned out to San José because he didn't impress the coach at Bolívar. In January 2020, he moved to fellow league club Royal Pari.

On 28 January 2021. Hernández returned to Spain and joined to UD Melilla on Segunda División B.

On 23 June 2022, Hernández joined Santiago Wanderers in the Primera B de Chile, his fourth experience playing for a South American club after Bolívar, San José and Royal Pari in Bolivia.

References

External links
 
 
 

1994 births
Living people
People from Donostialdea
Spanish footballers
Footballers from the Basque Country (autonomous community)
Association football forwards
La Liga players
Segunda División B players
Antiguoko players
Real Sociedad B footballers
Real Sociedad footballers
Barakaldo CF footballers
Bilbao Athletic footballers
Burgos CF footballers
UD Melilla footballers
Eerste Divisie players
FC Den Bosch players
Bolivian Primera División players
Club Bolívar players
Club San José players
Royal Pari F.C. players
Primera B de Chile players
Santiago Wanderers footballers
Spanish expatriate footballers
Spanish expatriate sportspeople in the Netherlands
Spanish expatriate sportspeople in Bolivia
Spanish expatriate sportspeople in Chile
Expatriate footballers in the Netherlands
Expatriate footballers in Bolivia
Expatriate footballers in Chile
Spain youth international footballers